The Old Danish Pointer is a medium-sized  breed of dog, white with brown markings, originally used as a pointing dog in Denmark.

Description

Appearance 
Old Danish Pointers (Danish: gammel dansk hønsehund, translated "Old Danish Fowl-Dog") are strongly built. One of the most charming features of the breed is the great difference between male and female. While the dog is powerful and substantial, the female is characterized by being lighter, more spirited, and capricious.

 Height at the withers: 	
 Male  , above    preferred.
 Female , above  preferred.
 Weight:
 Male 
 Female

Temperament 
Conveys the impression of a quiet and stable dog showing determination and courage. During the hunt, the dog progresses rather slowly, always maintaining contact with the hunter and accomplishing its task as a pointing dog without creating unnecessary disturbance of the ground. The breed is suited for small as well as large hunting grounds.
The name has nothing to do with temperament, but refers to its ability to point out  birds of the order Galliformes and specifically birds belonging to the family Phasianidae. Commonly referred to in Danish as Hen birds/Chicken birds. The often used English name, "Old Danish Chicken Dog" is therefore incorrect or at best badly translated.

This is a friendly family dog, as long as it gets its exercise. It is fast and active outdoors and quiet indoors, but is not suitable for apartments or small yards.

History 

The Danish Pointer dates back to the 17th Century and descends from the Spanish Pointer.

See also
 Dogs portal
 List of dog breeds

References

FCI breeds
Gundogs
Pointers
Dog breeds originating in Denmark
Rare dog breeds